Thrichomys is a genus of South American rodents in the family Echimyidae. It contains at least five species, found in Bolivia, Brazil and Paraguay. They are as follows:
 Thrichomys apereoides - Common punaré 
 Thrichomys fosteri - Foster's punaré 
 Thrichomys inermis - Highlands punaré 
 Thrichomys laurentius - Sao Lourenço punaré 
 Thrichomys pachyurus - Paraguayan punaré

Phylogeny
The closest relatives of the genus Thrichomys are two clades consisting of pairs of Myocastorini genera: Callistomys (the painted tree-rat) and Myocastor (the coypu or nutria) in one clade, and Hoplomys (the armored rat) and Proechimys in the other.

References

 
Taxa named by Édouard Louis Trouessart
Rodent genera